Peel Regional Paramedic Services, provide ambulatory and paramedic care for the municipalities within Peel Region, in Ontario, Canada. Paramedic Headquarters are located in Brampton at 1600 Bovaird Road east and operations serve the residents of Caledon, Brampton, and Mississauga.

Peel Paramedics are overseen by Sunnybrook Centre for Prehospital Medicine (SCPM) and Base Hospital Director Sheldon Cheskes. The Paramedics have routinely been involved in ground breaking patient care studies that have revolutionized Emergency Patient Care in the ROC - Resuscitation Outcomes Consortium. ROC is a clinical trial network focusing on research in the area of pre-hospital cardiopulmonary arrest and severe traumatic injury.

Service Issues
Peel Paramedics routinely encounter off-load delays at area hospitals due to the volume of patients transported, lengthy wait times at local Emergency Rooms and the aging population in the Region of Peel.

Operations
Peel Region Paramedics operate in the following geographical entities within Peel Region 

 Mississauga, Ontario
 Brampton, Ontario
 Caledon, Ontario

List of Paramedic stations 

The following is a list of Paramedic stations as reported by the Region of Peel.

City of Mississauga

 Stn. 14 - Tomken Reporting and Satellite Station - 6825 Tomken Road, Mississauga
 Streetsville Reporting and Satellite Station - 2492 Thomas Street, Mississauga
 Stn. 00  - Maingate - 5299 Maingate Drive, Mississauga
 Stn. 01 - Tedlo - 2355 Tedlo Street, Mississauga
 Stn. 04/05 - Kitimat - 6810 Kitimat Road, Mississauga
 Stn. 13 - Goreway - 7101 Goreway Drive, Mississauga
 Stn. 15 - Winding Trail - 1355 Winding Trail, Mississauga
 Stn. 20 - Airport - 6375 Airport Road, Mississauga
 5845 Falborne Street, Mississauga
 3190 Mavis Road, Mississauga
 938 East Avenue, Mississauga
 75 Kingsway Drive, Mississauga
 1188 Lakeshore Road West, Mississauga

City of Brampton

 Stn. 19 - Fernforest Reporting and Administration Station - 1600 Bovaird Drive East, Brampton
 Stn. 21 -  Rising Hill Reporting and Satellite Station - 25 Rising Hill Ridge, Brampton
 Stn. 08 - Heartlake - 91 Sandalwood Parkway East, Brampton
 Stn. 15 - The Gore - 10775 The Gore Road, Brampton
 Stn. 16 - Victoria - 40 Victoria Drive, Brampton
 Stn. 18 - Exchange - 75 Exchange Drive, Brampton
 20 Lynch Drive (Peel Memorial Urgent Care Centre), Brampton

Town of Caledon

 Stn. 10 - Bolton - 28 Ann Street, Caledon
 Stn. 11 - Caledon - 3611 Charleston Side Road, Caledon
 Stn. 12 - Valleywood - 2 Snelcrest Drive, Caledon

Fleet
 100 Ambulances & Vehicles 
 Type III - Ford & Chevy chassis (3XXX)
 Type III Tactical
 Chrysler minivan - Public Education and Outreach
 Dodge Charger - Platoon Manager
 Chevy Impala- Administration
 Ford Expedition- Rapid Response Units
 Chevy Tahoe- Supervisor Vehicles and Rapid Response units 
 Ford Taurus- Deputy Chief
 3 Ford Transit-logistics vehicles

Power Stretchers

The first Stryker Power Pro XT was rolled out July, 2016. Full fleet installation completed January, 2017.

Services
 Primary Care Paramedics
 Advanced Care Paramedics
 Tactical Paramedic Units
 Rapid Response Units
 Community Paramedics

See also

Paramedicine in Canada
List of EMS Services in Ontario
Paramedics in Canada
Emergency Medical Services in Canada

Emergency Services in Peel Region
Peel Regional Police
Brampton Fire and Rescue
Mississauga Fire and Emergency Services

References

External links
 Peel Regional Paramedic Services
 Peel Paramedic Association
 Peel Paramedic Union, OPSEU Local 277

Ambulance services in Canada
Regional Municipality of Peel
Emergency medical services in Canada